Freeling may refer to:

 Major-General Sir Arthur Henry Freeling, Surveyor-General of South Australia from 1849 to 1861
Freeling, South Australia, a small town, named for Arthur Freeling
Christian Freeling, Dutch game designer and inventor/author of various chess variants
Sir Francis Freeling, first baronet (1764–1836), postal administrator and book collector (ODNB)
Nicolas Freeling, crime writer
Freeling is the surname of the main character Carol Anne and her family in the Poltergeist (film) trilogy as well as in the novelizations based on the films.